Cecil Creek is a stream in the U.S. state of Washington.

Cecil Creek was named after Julia Cecil, an Indian who settled there.

See also
List of rivers of Washington

References

Rivers of Okanogan County, Washington
Rivers of Washington (state)